Publius Licinius Crassus may refer to:

 Publius Licinius Crassus Junianus
 Publius Licinius Crassus (consul 171 BC)
 Publius Licinius Crassus (consul 97 BC)
 Publius Licinius Crassus (son of triumvir)
 Publius Licinius Crassus Dives Mucianus
 Publius Licinius Crassus Dives (consul 205 BC)
 Publius Licinius Crassus Dives (praetor 57 BC)

See also
 Crassus (cognomen)